A Change of Heart is a 2017 American comedy film directed by Kenny Ortega and starring Jim Belushi, Virginia Madsen, Kathy Najimy, Eduardo Yáñez, Gloria Estefan and William Levy.

Plot
Discouraged with cards that life has dealt him, Hank (Jim Belushi) is a man whose circumstances have steered him to fear change, but his town is adhering less to traditional white man and wife partnerships of which he is comfortable. After suffering a heart attack, Hank's life is saved by a transplant from a Puerto Rican drag queen. What will Hank do? Embrace a diverse society or continue to fear change? Tackling sensitive issues that need to be addressed in today's society, A Change of Heart is a feel-good movie that reminds us that even the most stubborn and hardened souls among us can still change and learn to let love in.

Cast
Jim Belushi as Hank
Virginia Madsen as Deena
Kathy Najimy as Ruthie
Aimee Teegarden as Josie
Cody Horn as Teddy
Dawn Olivieri as Laurie
Eduardo Yáñez as Cousin David
Gloria Estefan as Dr. Farjado
William Levy as Carlos
Mauricio Sanchez as Corky
Roberto Escobar as Tio Ruben

Production
The film was shot in Miami.

Release
A Change of Heart premiered on March 10, 2017, at the Miami International Film Festival.  It premiered in Europe at the 2017 Parool Film Fest in Amsterdam, The Netherlands.  It has never been released theatrically or on home video/streaming.

References

External links
 

American comedy films
Films about racism in the United States
Films directed by Kenny Ortega
Films shot in Miami
2017 comedy films
2010s English-language films
2010s American films